Ripson Bridge is a truss bridge located southeast of Sorento, Illinois, in the United States. It is the last pony truss bridge in Bond County, and one of a few remaining pony truss bridges left in the state of Illinois. Ripson Bridge was designated a local and county historical site in 1988.

History
Ripson Bridge was built over Shoal Creek in 1895 on property originally owned by Cyrus Ripson. Ripson Bridge was a part of the transportation system in Bond County until 1988 when a new bridge was completed in the summer of 1988 just north of Ripson Bridge. Shortly after, the bridge was sold to the Sorento Homecoming Association. The Sorento Homecoming Association sold the bridge and Ripson Bridge is now owned by private owners.

Festival
On Sunday, September 25, 1988, the first Ripson Bridge Festival was held. The Ripson Bridge Festival was held annually until 2016 and has become an important part of the community fabric of Sorento and its citizens. In 2016, the Ripson Bridge Festival was forced to relocated to downtown Sorento because of severe rains and flooding. It has since been held in downtown Sorento and has been renamed the Sorento Fall Festival. Over 10,000 people attended the Ripson Bridge Festival in 2013.

The Sorento Fall Festival is usually held during the first Sunday in October.

References

Bridges completed in 1895
Transportation buildings and structures in Bond County, Illinois
Former road bridges in the United States
Bridges in Greater St. Louis
Truss bridges in the United States
Road bridges in Illinois